WSIL may refer to:

 WSIL-TV, a television station based in Harrisburg, Illinois.
 Web Services in Learning (WSIL), a forum for vendors in the eLearning space to jointly propose/develop a library of standard web services.
Web Services Inspection Language, a specification for discovery of web services